The Man from Utopia is an album by American musician Frank Zappa, released in March 1983 by Barking Pumpkin Records. The album is named after a 1950s song, written by Donald and Doris Woods, which Zappa covers as part of "The Man from Utopia Meets Mary Lou".

Production 
"The Dangerous Kitchen", "Mōggio" and "The Jazz Discharge Party Hats" were all prepared for Zappa's unreleased album Chalk Pie.

The album was the second of two to credit Steve Vai with "impossible guitar parts", the first album being the preceding album Ship Arriving Too Late to Save a Drowning Witch (1982).

Cover art
The sleeve art features the work of Tanino Liberatore. It portrays Zappa on stage trying to kill mosquitoes. That is a reference to a concert held in Italy in 1982, the year before the release of the album, on 7 July at Parco Redecesio (which is also referred in a street sign on the album cover) in Segrate, near Milan. While Zappa was playing, a huge number of mosquitoes began flying on stage and gave the band a hard time. The back cover shows the audience as seen from the stage during the 1982 concert in Palermo, which ended in a riot.

The sleeve art is also a reference to Liberatore's comic character RanXerox.

Music and lyrics 

The album's opening track "Cocaine Decisions", with its groove redolent of skiffle washboards, is an attack on drug-influenced businessmen and features a harmonica. "The Dangerous Kitchen" satirizes dirty, unkempt kitchens.

"The Dangerous Kitchen", "The Radio Is Broken", and "The Jazz Discharge Party Hats" all feature Zappa's "meltdown" style of generally pre-written but sometimes improvised singing/speaking. For "Jazz" and "Kitchen", Zappa had guitarist Steve Vai overdub complex guitar parts for the entire length of the songs, which perfectly copied Zappa's every word and syllable. This unique type of overdub was a one-time experiment that Zappa never repeated. Hungarian composer Péter Eötvös said in an interview:

Release history 

The album was originally released on vinyl in 1983. An unauthorized CD of this edition (with the exception of a remixed "Mōggio") was issued by EMI in the UK in 1986.  The album was issued (in remixed and resequenced form with one additional track) on CD in 1993 by Barking Pumpkin. The later 1995 Rykodisc edition and the 2012 Universal Music Group release are identical.

Track listing 
All songs written, composed and arranged by Frank Zappa, except where noted.

Personnel 
 Frank Zappa – guitar, vocals, drum machine, ARP 2600, Prophet 5 Synthesizer
 Steve Vai – guitar, acoustic guitar,impossible guitar parts
 Ray White – guitar, vocals
 Roy Estrada – vocals
 Bob Harris – boy soprano
 Ike Willis – vocals
 Bobby Martin – keyboards, saxophone, vocals
 Tommy Mars – keyboards
 Arthur Barrow – keyboards, bass, micro bass, rhythm guitar
 Ed Mann – percussion
 Scott Thunes – bass
 Jay Anderson – string bass
 Chad Wackerman – drums
 Vinnie Colaiuta – drums
 Craig Twister Steward – harmonica
 Dick Fegy – mandolin
 Marty Krystall – saxophone

Charts 
Album - Billboard (United States)

References 

1983 albums
Albums produced by Frank Zappa
Barking Pumpkin Records albums
Frank Zappa albums